My Big Love is a 2008 Philippine romantic comedy film directed by Jade Castro as well as written by Michiko Yamamoto and Theodore Boborol. Starring Sam Milby and Toni Gonzaga together with Prinsesa ng Banyera lead actress Kristine Hermosa. This is the last film to feature Milby and Gonzaga after You Are the One (2006) and You Got Me! (2007).

Plot
The story follows Macky (Sam Milby), an obese pastry chef whose physical transformation from weight loss catches the attention of his dream girl, Niña (Kristine Hermosa), and his personal trainer, Aira (Toni Gonzaga), causing a love triangle to develop.

Cast

References

External links
 

2008 films
Star Cinema films
2000s Tagalog-language films
Philippine romance films
Films directed by Jade Castro